R-3 was a proposed Romanian tank design for use in World War II. It was basically a variant of the Czechoslovak S-II-c tank prototype (known as the T-21 tank after 1939) which was going to be built in Romania because of the repeated acquisition failures. Because of political reasons and the limited industrial capacities of both Škoda Works and the Romanian industry, the design never entered production.

History

In the summer of 1940, Romania's traditional interwar arms delivery partners, France and Czechoslovakia, were under German occupation. Romania's armored forces were equipped with 126 light R-2 tanks, 75 Renault R-35 tanks (41 of which were interned Polish tanks), 35 R-1 tankettes and 75 obsolete Renault FT tanks. As the country was basically surrounded by hostile neighbours from all sides and the Renault R-35 tank deliveries were stopped, the Romanian Army sought to buy a medium tank.

The chosen design was the Czechoslovak S-II-c prototype, the successor of the LT vz. 35 light tank. The Romanian trials and field testing of the tank started in late 1939. This choice came naturally, as Romanian troops were already familiar with its predecessor. The prototype was later designated by Škoda Works as the T-21 medium tank. Nazi Germany refused to deliver tanks to Romania because the country was not yet part of the Axis.

In August 1940, the talks were resumed, as Germany sold the license of an improved variant of the T-21 tank to Hungary. The Hungarian engineers improved the two T-22 prototypes sent to them by Germany and built the tank under the 40M Turán I designation. Romania, now part of the Axis, placed an order for 216 tanks in January 1941, but Germany couldn't deliver the tanks because of the limited resources. The delivery would have disrupted the production of other tanks.

In June 1941, Romania ordered 287 R-3 tanks from Skoda, but Germany only delivered 26 worn-out Panzer 35(t)s. Rebuffed repeatedly, Romania eventually offered to build the tanks locally, but the country lacked the industrial resources to produce medium tanks and the project was eventually canceled.

Later 1942 Romanian medium tank project

British historian Mark Axworthy writes how the Romanians wanted to produce a tank comparable to the T-34. Romanian documents give the characteristics of this tank, the proposal of which came by the end of 1942. It was to be a medium tank weighing 16-18 tonnes, reaching a maximum speed of 50 km/h. Its crew was to be of four members, its armament a main gun with a caliber of 50 mm or higher, along with one or two machine guns. The armor was to be of 40-60 mm. According to Axworthy, the project was abandoned, being too challenging for the Romanian industry; Romania instead produced a number of tank destroyers, which proved to be more adequate for its industry, including the Mareșal, TACAM R-2 and TACAM T-60.

Notes

References

 Mark Axworthy, Cornel Scafeș, Cristian Crăciunoiu,Third Axis. Fourth Ally. Romanian Armed Forces in the European War, 1941-1945, Arms and Armour, London, 1995.

External links
 Picture of a S-II-c prototype
 Pictures of T-22 during trials in Hungary

World War II armoured fighting vehicles of Romania
Tanks of Romania
World War II medium tanks
Tanks introduced in 1938